Oh My may refer to:

 Oh My!, a Swedish indiepop band
 "Oh My" (Dappy song), 2018
 "Oh My" (DJ Drama song), 2011
 "Oh My" (Gin Wigmore song), 2009
 "Oh My", a song by Ladyhawke from Ladyhawke
 "Oh My", a song by Haley Reinhart from Listen Up!
 "Oh My", a song by Illy from Two Degrees
 "Oh My...", a track from the soundtrack of the 2015 video game Undertale by Toby Fox

See also 
 "Oops (Oh My)", a 2002 song by Tweet
 Oh My My (disambiguation)
 Oh My God (disambiguation)
 My Oh My (disambiguation)